Gásadalur is a village located on the west side of Vágar, Faroe Islands, and enjoys a panoramic view over to the island of Mykines.

Gásadalur is located on the edge of Mykinesfjørður, surrounded by the highest mountains on Vágar. Árnafjall towers to a height of 722 metres to the north, and Eysturtindur to the east is 715 metres high. Here too, the view south to Tindhólmur and Gáshólmur is quite magnificent. Eysturtindur translates to English as "the Peak in the East".

The boat landing site is very poor, because it is located somewhat higher than the seashore. So if the residents wanted to fish, they were obliged to keep their boats near Bøur. In 1940, during the British occupation of the Faroe Islands, a stairway was built from the beach up to the village.

In order to reach any of the other villages by land, residents had to take the strenuous route over mountains more than 400 metres high. This isolation explains why the village population had decreased. In 2002 there were only sixteen people living in Gásadalur, and several of the houses stand empty today. It had a population of 18 in 2012. It had a population of 11 in 2020.

In 2004 the Gásadalstunnilin tunnel was blasted through the rock, and it became possible to drive through by car. The residents hope this will mean that the village population will increase again. While the population increased briefly and reached a peak of 23 in 2010 it has only decreased since then and is at only 11 as of 2020. There are good opportunities for farming, and the same number of fields as in Bøur, but here only a few are royal estate, while most of them are freehold land.

Etymology
There is a story that the village was named after a woman called Gæsa, who came from Kirkjubøur. She had eaten meat during the Lent fast, and for this unholy deed all her property was confiscated. She fled to the valley on Vágar, which was named after her. Most other village stories are about spirits and elves.

A more likely explanation is that Gásadalur (Goose Valley) is named after the wild geese, which from ancient times have traveled to the valley.

Gallery of images of Gásadalur

See also
 List of towns in the Faroe Islands

References

External links
Faroestamps.fo (public domain)
Faroeislands.dk: Gásadalur Images and description of all cities on the Faroe Islands.

Populated places in the Faroe Islands
Vágar